Cyperus sphaeroideus is a species of sedge that is native to eastern parts of Australia.

See also 
 List of Cyperus species

References 

sphaeroideus
Plants described in 1973
Flora of Queensland
Flora of New South Wales
Flora of Victoria (Australia)
Taxa named by Lawrence Alexander Sidney Johnson